In number theory, specifically in Diophantine approximation theory, the Markov constant  of an irrational number  is the factor for which Dirichlet's approximation theorem can be improved for .

History and motivation 

Certain numbers can be approximated well by certain rationals; specifically, the convergents of the continued fraction are the best approximations by rational numbers having denominators less than a certain bound. For example, the approximation  is the best rational approximation among rational numbers with denominator up to 56. Also, some numbers can be approximated more readily than others. Dirichlet proved in 1840 that the least readily approximable numbers are the rational numbers, in the sense that for every irrational number there exists infinitely many rational numbers approximating it to a certain degree of accuracy that only finitely many such rational approximations exist for rational numbers . Specifically, he proved that for any number  there are infinitely many pairs of relatively prime numbers  such that  if and only if  is irrational.

 

If we omit these numbers, just as we omitted the rational numbers in Dirichlet's theorem, then we can increase the number  to 2. Again this new bound is best possible in the new setting, but this time the number , and numbers equivalent to it, limits the bound. If we don't allow those numbers then we can again increase the number on the right hand side of the inequality from 2 to /5, for which the numbers equivalent to  limits the bound. The numbers generated show how well these numbers can be approximated, this can be seen as a property of the real numbers.

However, instead of considering Hurwitz's theorem (and the extensions mentioned above) as a property of the real numbers except certain special numbers, we can consider it as a property of each excluded number. This leads us to consider how accurately each number can be approximated by rationals - specifically, by how much can the factor in Dirichlet's approximation theorem be increased to from 1 for that specific number.

Definition 
If the set does not have an upper bound we define . 

Properties and results 
Hurwitz's theorem implies that  for all .  

If  is its continued fraction expansion then .

From the above, if  then . This implies that  if and only if  is not bounded. In particular,  if  is a quadratic irrationality.

If  where  then . In particular if  them .

The set  forms the Lagrange spectrum. It contains the interval  where F is Freiman's constant.

Numbers having a Markov constant less than 3 
Burger et al. (2002) provides a formula for which the quadratic irrationality  whose Markov constant is the nth Lagrange number:

Nicholls (1978) provides a geometric proof of this (based on circles tangent to each other), providing a method that these numbers can be systematically found.

Examples

Markov constant of two numbers 
Since , 

 

Numbers  having Markov constant less than 3 
Consider ; Then . By trial and error it can be found that . Then

See also 
Lagrange number
Continued fraction
Lagrange spectrum

References 

Continued fractions
Diophantine approximation